Bicyclus feae is a butterfly in the family Nymphalidae. It is found on Bioko, an island off the west coast of Africa.

References

Elymniini
Butterflies described in 1910
Endemic fauna of Equatorial Guinea
Insects of Equatorial Guinea
Fauna of Bioko
Butterflies of Africa